Loai Mohammad Haj Bakr al-Saqa is a Syrian member of al-Qaeda, convicted of masterminding and financing the 2003 Istanbul bombings. In February 2007, he was sentenced to 67 life sentences by the Turkish courts.

He was arrested in August 2005, while allegedly planning a bomb attack against an Israeli cruise ship. He was accused of supplying Turkish militants $170,000 to perform the bombing.

Unlike some of the six Turkish men also given life sentences for the attacks, al-Saqa maintained his innocence throughout the trial.

Al-Saqa's lawyer was banned from the court for "aiding and abetting al-Qaeda", and al-Saqa was twice thrown out of the court himself, once at his first court appearance in March 2006 for refusing to stand and identify himself to the judge and again two months later for wearing an orange jumpsuit similar to those worn by prisoners in Guantanamo Bay.

During his trial, al-Saqa was questioned by prosecutor Huseyin Canan about the beheading of British engineer Kenneth Bigley in Iraq.

References

Syrian al-Qaeda members
Living people
Year of birth missing (living people)